The "FinePix Z5 FD" is an ultracompact 6.3 megapixel digital camera produced  by Fujifilm measuring 92.8(W) × 55.0(H) × 19.4(D)mm (3.6(W) x 2.2(H) x 0.8(D) inch).  It is an autofocus camera made in three colors: raspberry red, mocha brown, and silver.  In Japan it was also available in a mix of black and white colors.  As with other Finepix models, the Z5fd was also extensively promoted in Japan by Yuri "Ebi-chan" Ebihara. The camera uses a non-protruding, folded optics design Fujinon 3× zoom lens system (F3.5–F4.2) with a focal length of F6.1-18.3 mm which is equivalent to 36–108 mm on a 35 mm camera.

Specifications
It has 6.3 megapixels, a 1/2.5" Super CCD HR sensor and 3× optical zoom.
Its ISO range is up to 1600.
It uses Real Processor II, face recognition and has 26 MB of internal memory.
It supports xD-Picture Cards, USB 2.0 and Intelligent flash.

Photography mode
Sliding the lens cover and the camera turns itself on very quickly and the front "Z5" lettering illuminates.  The all-metal-bodied camera is then ready to take pictures in seconds.  External controls around the camera are straightforward and easy to use for normal everyday users. However, the buttons are almost flat against the back panel making them a bit difficult to assume they were pressed.  For more advanced settings, users must use Fujifilm's menu system.  
The rear of the camera has a large  LCD TFT display with 230,000 pixels that display images in high quality and a high frame rate of 60 frame/s (Frame rate can be changed from 15, 30, and 60).  
Zoom control is actuated by the thumb and can zoom up to 18.5× (3× optical and 6.2× digital). 
The Fujinon lens is sharp compared to other ultra slim folded optic cameras from other manufacturers and takes vivid images.  
The Z5fd's autofocus system is quicker than one expects from a camera of this price and range.  The face detection system locates faces by highlighting them in a green box.  Up to ten different faces can be detected at one time for easy focusing.  Pressing the small shutter release button to take photos.  

Unfortunately, the Z5fd does not have an aperture or shutter priority setting, but the user can change ISO setting, white balance, and exposure compensation.  
Fujifilm supplies a 14-pin USB cord and utilizes fast USB 2.0 hardware to upload images to a computer.  
Unlike other camera manufacturers which supply a wall charger, charging the battery on the Z5fd uses the same 14-pin port on the camera combined with an AC adapter from Fujifilm.

Movie mode

The movie mode is turned on by a switch on top of the camera next to the shutter release button.  Movies are recorded in AVI format (motion JPEG) with monaural sound.  Picture quality is good with Fine resolution set as 640×480 at 30 frame/s.  Other resolution setting is 320×240 at 30 frame/s for long movie recording.

Power requirements

The standard USB cable supplied with the camera does not provide power.
The connector on the camera is a proprietary shape captive cable. Both the power supply and the data cable use the same 14-pin connector.
The power supply label says 5 volts at 1.5 amp. The camera label says 5 volts at 3 watts.
Battery is a lithium Ion type rated at 3.7 v and 750 mAh (Fujifilm OEM model number NP-40).

Criticism

With its small sensor size, different exterior color options and no aperture and shutter priority modes, this camera is being said by critics as a female users' camera.
Although this camera has a picture stabilization feature called "Anti-Blur", there is no mechanical stabilizer such as optical or CCD-shift stabilization.  The camera only changes its sensitivity to ISO 1600 and high shutter speed.
Face detection works well, but only if the person(s) in the image is not wearing headwear such as hats, sunglasses, or even eyeglasses and is facing directly into the camera.
Some users have experienced pink fringing or pink vertical bands along the left side of the image.  Fujifilm along with the Super CCD has been known for this problem and has yet to fix the problem completely.
Fujifilm's proprietary xD-Picture cards are expensive compared to SD and CF counterparts and as of 2009 the largest size available to consumers is only 2 GB.

Shooting Modes (Programs)
 Normal: Auto
 Picture Stabilization
 14 Scene Position - 
 Natural light - optimized pictures without the use of the flash.
 Natural light and with flash - two pictures are recorded, one after the other with and without flash.
 Portrait - Soft skin tones and edges
 Landscape - No flash option available
 Sport - High Speed shooting mode enabled and high speed shutter.
 Night - Slow sync flash and slow shutter speed.
 Fireworks - No flash with limited user selectable shutter speed.
 Sunset - Colors are enhanced.
 Snow - Adjusted white balance.
 Beach - Adjusted white balance.
 Museum - No sound, flash or illumination light.
 Party - Red-eye reduction and high ISO sensitivity enabled.
 Flower Close-up - Macro, no flash.
 Text - Macro, optimized for better text viewing with no flash
 Burst/Continuous - 
 Top-3 (3 continuous exposure)
 Final-3 (many exposure, only last three pictures saved)
 Long-period (all pictures saved, up to memory size)

References

Further reading 
USB Power

Z5fd